The Last Days of Dolwyn (renamed Woman of Dolwyn for the American market) is a 1949 British drama film directed by Emlyn Williams and starring Edith Evans, Emlyn Williams, Richard Burton and Anthony James. The screenplay focuses on a Welshman, who has done well in London, who returns home planning to flood the village he grew up in—setting up a conflict between residents who are spiritually attached to the place and the values of the majority for whom money is a more persuasive force.

The film marked the first film appearance of Burton, the first film appearance of Edith Evans since 1916, and the sole film to be directed by Emlyn Williams, who also wrote the screenplay.

Plot
The story is set in 1892 in and around the small peaceful (fictional) farming village of Dolwyn in Mid-Wales.

A massive dam and reservoir to supply water to Liverpool has been constructed at the head of the valley above Dolwyn, but construction has stopped because of geological difficulties; what was thought to be limestone is actually granite. Realising that a cheaper and easier scheme would involve the flooding of the village (but unaware that the village was inhabited), Lord Lancashire, the scheme's promoter, dispatches an agent, Rob, to visit the village and buy the land. Rob persuades a reluctant, and debt-ridden, Lady Dolwyn to sell the land, and offers the leaseholders large sums for their leases. They are also offered new houses in a Liverpool suburb and jobs in a cotton mill for those who want them. Rob has his own reasons for wanting the village flooded; he is a native of Dolwyn, but was stoned out of it twenty years before for thievery. He therefore hates and despises the villagers, who are actually oblivious to his shameful past and bear him no ill will.

Of all those in the village, old Merri is the most reluctant to leave. Her son is buried in the graveyard and she hates the idea of the grave being flooded as his father died by drowning.

Whilst preparing to pack up and leave, Gareth (played by Richard Burton), who has also lived in England and is more conversant with the language, discovers documents that prove his foster-mother, Merri (who has very little English), has a right to own her land in perpetuity. A solicitor confirms this title. Lord Lancashire himself visits Merri, but soon realises that this simple village woman cannot be bought off or cajoled. To top it all, she is able to cure his rheumatic shoulder with simple manipulation. He decides to preserve the village and use the more expensive and difficult method of construction instead. Rob is furious and decides to open the dam's spillway valves to flood the valley. He is unable to do so and instead decides to set fire to Merri's cottage.

He is confronted by Gareth and a fight ensues. Rob is knocked down by Gareth and falls into the fire he himself set. Gareth tries to beat out the flames but Rob dies. Merri has witnessed the events: determined that the killing shall not be discovered, she conceals the body, then makes her way to the dam's valve room and opens the valves. The villagers watch sadly from nearby safe ground as their beloved village is slowly drowned.

One young shepherd has refused to flee the flood and his defiant, lilting tenor voice is suddenly silenced as the tide consumes him. Thus is fulfilled the message of a short prelude to the film showing a plaque marking the flood and the deaths of two people, only one of whose bodies was recovered.

Cast

 Edith Evans – Merri
 Emlyn Williams – Rob
 Richard Burton – Gareth
 Anthony James – Dafydd
 Allan Aynesworth – Lord Lancashire
 Barbara Couper – Lady Dolwyn
 Andrea Lea – Margaret
 Hugh Griffith – The Minister
 Maurice Browning – Huw
 Rita Crailey – Hen Ann
 Eileen Dale – Mrs. Ellis
 David Davies – Septimus
 Frank Dunlop – Ephrain
 Kenneth Evans – Jabbez
 Patricia Glyn – Dorcas
 Joan Griffiths – Eira
 Sam Hinton – Idris
 Dafydd Havard – Will
 Roddy Hughes – Caradoc
 Madoline Thomas – Mrs. Thomas
 Sybil Williams
 Tom Jones – John Henry
 Linda Hughes - little girl

Historical parallels
The film's setting parallels the drowning in the 1880s of the village of Llanwddyn in Lake Vyrnwy to provide water for Liverpool. The emotive content may also be based on Welsh reaction to the construction of the Elan Valley Reservoirs, designed to supply water to Birmingham, and the tragic flooding of the beautiful neighbourhood of Nantgwyllt, beloved of the poet Shelley.

In the 1960s, real life mirrored fiction when Llyn Celyn was built to provide further water to Liverpool, flooding the village of Capel Celyn.

Reception 
The film performed disappointingly at the box office despite good reviews.

References

External links 
 

1949 films
1949 drama films
British historical films
1940s historical films
British drama films
Films produced by Anatole de Grunwald
Films set in the 1890s
Films set in Wales
Fictional populated places in Wales
British black-and-white films
1940s English-language films
1940s British films